Pierre Béchu (10 March 1959 – 24 August 1988) was a French ice dancer. With Nathalie Hervé, he became a five-time French national champion, from 1980 to 1984. They placed eighth at the 1981 World Championships, fifth at the 1983 European Championships, and 14th at the 1984 Winter Olympics.

In August 1988, Hervé and Béchu were traveling with their daughter, Johanna, when their vehicle collided with another, killing Béchu and Johanna.

Early in his career, Béchu competed with Catherine Le Bail. They won bronze at the 1978 French Championships.

Results

With Hervé

With Le Bail

References

1949 births
1988 deaths
French male ice dancers
Olympic figure skaters of France
Figure skaters at the 1984 Winter Olympics
People from Bron
Road incident deaths in France
Sportspeople from Lyon Metropolis